Smena may refer to:
 Smena (camera) 
 Smena Minsk a Belarusian football club.
FC Smena Komsomolsk-on-Amur, Russian football club
 Smena (Slovak newspaper) was a Slovak language newspaper in 1995 taken over by SME
 Smena (newspaper) a newspaper in Russia.
 DYuSSh Smena-Zenit a soccer academy
 Smena (football club)